Salpi may refer to:

Geography
 Salapia, an ancient settlement in Daunia (present-day Apulia), Italy
Roman Catholic Diocese of Salpi

People
 Salpy, also transliterated Salpi, a feminine Armenian given name
 Salpi Ghazarian, Armenian-American academic
 M. Salpi, pen-name of Aram Sahakian, Armenian writer and doctor
Dimitris Salpingidis, Greek former professional football player

Arts
 Salpi (novel), a novel by Armenian writer Raffi